The 2020–21 Texas A&M Aggies women's basketball team represents Texas A&M University in the 2020–21 NCAA Division I women's basketball season. The team's head coach is Gary Blair, in his eighteenth season at Texas A&M. The team plays their home games at the Reed Arena in College Station, Texas, and in its ninth season as a member of the Southeastern Conference.

On February 28, the third-ranked Aggies defeated the fifth-ranked Gamecocks to win their first-ever SEC regular-season championship, since joining the conference in 2013. The team received a double-bye to advance to the quarterfinals of the SEC tournament.

Previous season
The Aggies finished the 2019–20 season with a record of 22–8 (10–6 SEC) and ranked 18th in the nation. They lost the SEC women's tournament quarterfinals round to Arkansas.

Preseason

SEC media poll
The SEC media poll was released on November 17, 2020.

Roster

Rankings

^Coaches' Poll did not release a second poll at the same time as the AP.

Schedule

|-
!colspan=6 style=|Non-conference season

|-
!colspan=6 style=|SEC regular season

|-
!colspan=6 style=| SEC Tournament

|-
!colspan=6 style=| NCAA tournament

References

Texas A&M Aggies women's basketball seasons
Texas A&M
Texas AandM Aggies women's basketball
Texas AandM Aggies women's basketball
Texas A&X